"Bird of Paradise" is the debut single by former Thin Lizzy guitarist Snowy White, from his debut album, White Flames, released in 1983. The single became White's biggest hit, peaking at no. 6 on the UK Singles Chart in January 1984, remaining on the chart for 11 weeks. The song was the only single released from the album, and is White's signature song.

The song has featured on various compilations of White's material, such as Goldtop: Groups & Sessions '74–'94, Pure Gold and The Best of Snowy White. White performed the song on the BBC Television show Top of the Pops in 1984.

British radio DJ Steve Wright described "Bird of Paradise" as "one of my favourite songs of all time", after playing the song on BBC Radio 1 during its run in the charts.

Personnel
Snowy White – guitars, vocals
Kuma Harada – bass guitar
Godfrey Wang – string synthesizer
Richard Bailey – drums, percussion

Charts

Weekly charts

Year-end charts

References

1983 debut singles
1983 songs
British soft rock songs